The Slavic-derived stem "Draz-" appears in many East-European proper names. These include:

 Draž, Draza, Dražan, Dražen, Drážovce
 Dražíč, Dražica, Dražice, Dražičky

Slavic given names